The 2022–23 season is the 135th season in the existence of Walsall Football Club and the club's fourth consecutive season in League Two. In addition to the league, they will also compete in the 2022–23 FA Cup, the 2022–23 EFL Cup and the 2022–23 EFL Trophy.

Transfers

In

Out

Loans in

Loans out

Pre-season and friendlies
On 24 May, the Saddlers announced their first two pre-season friendlies with Aston Villa and Coventry City to visit the Bescot Stadium. Three days later, two away fixtures were added to the schedule against Leamington and AFC Telford United. A fifth, against Solihull Moors was later added to the calendar.

Competitions

Overall record

League Two

League table

Results summary

Results by round

Matches

On 23 June, the league fixtures were announced. Walsall's away game against Doncaster Rovers was later brought forward to avoid a potential clash with an England world cup game. Walsall's last match of the season was pushed back due to the coronation of King Charles III

FA Cup

Walsall were drawn away to Wycombe Wanderers in the first round, at home to Carlisle United in the second round and away to Stockport County in the third round. Walsall hosted Leicester City in round 4 after a 95th-minute winner in the third round.

EFL Cup

The Saddlers were drawn at home to Swindon Town in the first round. Walsall were then drawn at home to League One side Charlton Athletic in the second round after winning 2–0 in the first round. Walsall then exited the Carabao Cup following a 1–0 loss to Charlton Athletic.

EFL Trophy

On 20 June, the initial Group stage draw was made, grouping Walsall with Cheltenham Town and Milton Keynes Dons. Three days later, West Ham United U21s joined Southern Group C.

References

Walsall
Walsall F.C. seasons